The Minor Prophets or Twelve Prophets (Shneim Asar; , Trei Asar, "Twelve") ("the Twelve Prophets"), occasionally Book of the Twelve, is a collection of prophetic books, written between about the 8th and 4th centuries BCE, which are in both the Jewish Tanakh and Christian Old Testament.

In the Tanakh, they appear as a single book, ("The Twelve"), which is the last book of the Nevi'im, the second of three major divisions of the Tanakh.

In the Christian Old Testament, the collection appears as twelve individual books, one for each of the prophets: the Book of Hosea, Joel, Amos, Obadiah, Jonah, Micah, Nahum, Habakkuk, Zephaniah, Haggai, Zechariah, and Malachi. Their order, and position in the Old Testament, varies slightly between the Protestant, Catholic and Eastern Orthodox Bibles.

The name "Minor Prophets" goes back apparently to St. Augustine, who distinguished the 12 shorter prophetic books as prophetae minores from the four longer books of the prophets Isaiah, Jeremiah, Ezekiel, and Daniel.

Composition

Individual books
Scholars usually assume that there exists an original core of prophetic tradition behind each book which can be attributed to the figure after whom it is named. In general, each book includes three types of material:
 Autobiographical material in the first person, some of which may go back to the prophet in question;
 Biographical materials about the prophet in the third person – which incidentally demonstrate that the collection and editing of the books was completed by persons other than the prophets themselves;
 Oracles or speeches by the prophets, usually in poetic form, and drawing on a wide variety of genres, including covenant lawsuit, oracles against the nations, judgment oracles, messenger speeches, songs, hymns, narrative, lament, law, proverb, symbolic gesture, prayer, wisdom saying, and vision.
The noteworthy exception is the Book of Jonah, an anonymous work which contains a narrative about the prophet Jonah.

As a collection
It is not known when these short works were collected and transferred to a single scroll, but the first extra-biblical evidence for the Twelve as a collection is c. 190 BCE in the writings of Yeshua ben Sirach, and evidence from the Dead Sea Scrolls suggests that the modern order of the Tanakh, which would potentially include the twelve, had been established by 150 BCE. It is believed that initially the first six were collected, and later the second six were added; the two groups seem to complement each other, with Hosea through Micah raising the question of iniquity, and Nahum through Malachi proposing resolutions.

Many, though not all, modern scholars agree that the editing process which produced the Book of the Twelve reached its final form in Jerusalem during the Achaemenid period (538–332 BCE), although there is disagreement over whether this was early or late.

The comparison of different ancient manuscripts indicates that the order of the individual books was originally fluid. The arrangement found in current Bibles is roughly chronological. First come those prophets dated to the early Assyrian period: Hosea, Amos, Obadiah, Jonah, and Micah; Joel is undated, but it was possibly placed before Amos because parts of a verse near the end of Joel (3.16 [4.16 in Hebrew]) and one near the beginning of Amos (1.2) are identical. Also we can find in both Amos (4.9 and 7.1–3) and Joel a description of a plague of locusts. These are followed by prophets that are set in the later Assyrian period: Nahum, Habakkuk, and Zephaniah. Last come those set in the Persian period: Haggai, Zechariah, and Malachi, although some scholars date "Second Zechariah" to the Hellenistic Era. However it is important to note that chronology was not the only consideration, as "It seems that an emphatic focus on Jerusalem and Judah was [also] a main concern. For example, Obadiah is generally understood as reflecting the destruction of Jerusalem in 586 BCE. and would therefore fit later in a purely chronological sequence.

Sequence of books

In the Hebrew Bible, these works are counted as one anthology. The works appear in the same order in Jewish, Protestant and Catholic Bibles, but in Eastern Orthodox Christian Bibles they are ordered according to the Septuagint. The books are in rough chronological order, according to explicit statements within the books themselves.

The twelve books are:

Christian commemoration
In the Roman Catholic Church, the twelve minor prophets are read in the Tridentine Breviary during the fourth and fifth weeks of November, which are the last two weeks of the liturgical year, before Advent.

In Year 1 of the modern Lectionary, Haggai, Zechariah, Jonah, Malachi, and Joel are read in weeks 25–27 of Ordinary Time.  In Year 2, Amos, Hosea, and Micah are read in weeks 14–16 of Ordinary Time. In Year 1 of the two-year cycle of the Office of Readings in the Liturgy of the Hours, Micah 4 and 7 are read in the third week of Advent; Amos, Hosea, Micah, Zephaniah, Nahum, and Habakkuk are read in weeks 22–29 of Ordinary Time.  In Year 2, Haggai and Zechariah 1–8 are read in weeks 11–12 of Ordinary Time; Obadiah, Joel, Malachi, Jonah, and Zechariah 9–14 are read in Week 18.

They are collectively commemorated in the Calendar of Saints of the Armenian Apostolic Church on July 31.

See also 
 Biblical prophecy
 Books of the Bible
 List of Biblical prophets
 Prophet

References

Further reading
 Achtemeier, Elizabeth R. & Murphy, Frederick J. The New Interpreter’s Bible, Vol. VII: Introduction to Apocalyptic Literature, Daniel, The Twelve Prophets (Abingdon, 1996)
 Cathcart, Kevin J. & Gordon, Robert P. The Targum of the Minor Prophets. The Aramaic Bible 14 (Liturgical Press, 1989)
 Chisholm, Robert B. Interpreting the Minor Prophets (Zondervan, 1990)
 
 
 Feinberg, Charles L. The Minor Prophets (Moody, 1990)
 Ferreiro, Alberto (ed). The Twelve Prophets. Ancient Christian Commentary on Scripture (Inter-Varsity Press, 2003)
 
 Hill, Robert C. (tr). Theodoret of Cyrus: Commentary on the Prophets Vol 3: Commentary on the Twelve Prophets (Holy Cross Orthodox Press, 2007)
 
 House, Paul R. The Unity of the Twelve. JSOT Supplement Series, 97 (Almond Press, 1990)
 Jones, Barry Alan. The Formation of the Book of the Twelve: a Study in Text and Canon. SBL Dissertation Series 149 (Society of Biblical Literature, 1995)
 Keil, Carl Friedrich. Keil on the Twelve Minor Prophets (1878) (Kessinger, 2008)
 Longman, Tremper & Garland, David E. (eds). Daniel–Malachi. The Expositor's Bible Commentary (Revised ed) 8 (Zondervan, 2009)
 McComiskey, Thomas Edward (ed). The Minor Prophets: An Exegetical and Expository Commentary (Baker, 2009)
 Navarre Bible, The: Minor Prophets (Scepter & Four Courts, 2005)
 Nogalski, James D. Literary Precursors to the Book of the Twelve. Beihefte zur Zeitschrift für die Alttestamentliche Wissenschaft (Walter de Gruyter, 1993)
 
 Petterson, Anthony R., ‘The Shape of the Davidic Hope across the Book of the Twelve’, Journal for the Study of the Old Testament 35 (2010), 225–46.
 Phillips, John. Exploring the Minor Prophets. The John Phillips Commentary Series. (Kregel, 2002)
 
 Roberts, Matis (ed). Trei asar: The Twelve Prophets: a New Translation with a Commentary Anthologized from Talmudic, Midrashic, and Rabbinic Sources (Mesorah, 1995–)
 Rosenberg, A.J. (ed). The Twelve Prophets: Hebrew Text and English Translation. Soncino Books of the Bible (Soncino, 2004)
 
 Shepherd, Michael B. "The Twelve Prophets in the New Testament" (Peter Lang, 2011)
 Slavitt, David R. (tr). The Book of the Twelve Prophets (Oxford University Press, 1999)
 Smith, James E. The Minor Prophets. Old Testament Survey (College Press, 1994)
 Stevenson, John. Preaching From The Minor Prophets To A Postmodern Congregation (Redeemer, 2008)
 Walton, John H. (ed). The Minor Prophets, Job, Psalms, Proverbs, Ecclesiastes, Song of Songs Zondervan Illustrated Bible Backgrounds Commentary (Zondervan, 2009)
 

 
Nevi'im
Prophetic books